Krkovo may refer to:

Slovenia
Krkovo pri Karlovici, a settlement in the Municipality of Velike Lašče
Krkovo nad Faro, a settlement in the Municipality of Kostel